Carl-Detlev Freiherr von Hammerstein (born January 26 1938 in Bockel) is a German politician and farmer.  He has been a member of the Christian Democratic Union of Germany (CDU) in Rotenburg, Germany since 1975, and a member of the German federal parliament representing the CDU from 1983 to 1987. He served in parliament again from 1990 to 2002, representing the Verden-Osterholz constituency. Aside from his political career, Hammerstein has been a farmer and forester since 1961 in Gyhum-Bockel. He was married to Lily Gräfin von der Schulenburg (1937–2015), and has three children.

External links 

 Bundestag.de: Carl-Detlev Freiherr von Hammerstein
 Spiegel.de: Carl-Detlev von Hammersteins Aussagen, July 9, 2003

References 

1938 births
Living people
Members of the Bundestag for the Christian Democratic Union of Germany
Members of the Bundestag 1983–1987
Members of the Bundestag 1990–1994
Members of the Bundestag 1994–1998
Members of the Bundestag 1998–2002
Members of the Bundestag for Lower Saxony
20th-century German politicians
German farmers
German landowners